He Who Loves in a Glass House is a 1971 West German film directed by Michael Verhoeven. It was entered into the 21st Berlin International Film Festival.

Cast
 Senta Berger
 Marianne Blomquist
 Hartmut Becker

References

External links

1971 films
1971 drama films
German drama films
West German films
1970s German-language films
Films directed by Michael Verhoeven
Adultery in films
1970s German films